Robert L. Leahy  is a psychologist and author and editor of 29 books dedicated to cognitive behaviour therapy. He is Director of the American Institute for Cognitive Therapy in New York and Clinical Professor of Psychology in the Department of Psychiatry at Weill Cornell Medical College.

Early life and education 
Leahy was born in Alexandria, Virginia, the son of James J Leahy, a salesman, and Lillian DeVita, an executive secretary. His parents separated when he was 18 months old and his mother moved Robert to New Haven, Connecticut. He was educated at Yale University (B.A, M.S, MPhil., PhD) and later completed a Post-doctoral Fellowship in the Department of Psychiatry at the University of Pennsylvania Medical School under the direction of Aaron T. Beck, M.D., the Founder of Cognitive Therapy.

Career and research interests
Leahy became interested in Beck's Cognitive Therapy model after becoming disillusioned with the psychodynamic model which he felt lacked sufficient empirical support. Many of his clinical books have been instrumental in disseminating the cognitive therapy model in its application to the treatment of depression, bipolar disorder, anxiety disorders, jealousy, and emotion regulation. In addition, he has published widely on the application of the cognitive model to the therapeutic relationship, transference and counter-transference, resistance to change, and beliefs about emotion regulation that may underpin problematic strategies for coping with or responding to emotions in the therapeutic context. His clinical and popular audience books have been translated into 21 languages.
Leahy has expanded the cognitive model with his social cognitive model of emotion which he refers to as Emotional Schema Therapy. According to this model individuals differ in their beliefs about the legitimacy of certain emotions, their duration, the ability to express emotions, the need to control emotions, how similar their emotions are to those of others and the ability to tolerate ambivalent feelings. These beliefs and the strategies connected to them are referred to as "emotional schemas". The Emotional Schema Model draws on Beck's cognitive model, the metacognitive model advanced by AdrIan Wells, the Acceptance and Commitment Model advanced by Steven C. Hayes, and on social cognitive research on attribution processes and implicit theories of emotion. Leahy has described how his model can help in understanding and treating jealousy, envy, ambivalence and other emotions and how these emotional schemas can impact intimate relationships and affect the therapeutic relationship.

In addition to his work on emotional schemas, Leahy has written about problematic styles of judgment and decision making that are relevant in depression and anxiety disorders. These include biased evaluations in over-estimating or under-estimating risk, sunk-cost effects, regret anticipation, rumination over regret, and inaccurate predictions of emotions following anticipated outcomes.

Awards and achievements 
In 2014, Robert L. Leahy received the Aaron T. Beck Award from the Academy of Cognitive Therapy. In 2021 he received an Honorary Doctor of Humane Letters degree from the Philadelphia College of Osteopathic Medicine.

Organisational affiliations
He is Past President of The Association of Behavioral and Cognitive Therapies, The Academy of Cognitive Therapy, and The International Association of Cognitive Therapy. He is the former Editor of The Journal of Cognitive Psychotherapy and current Associate Editor of the International Journal of Cognitive Theapy.

Books 
 Bipolar Disorder: A Cognitive Therapy Approach (2001) 
 Psychology And The Economic Mind: Cognitive Processes and Conceptualization (2002) 
 Psychological Treatment of Bipolar Disorder (2003) 
 Roadblocks in Cognitive-Behavioral Therapy: Transforming Challenges into Opportunities for Change (2003) 
 The Worry Cure: Seven Steps to Stop Worry from Stopping You (2005) 
 Contemporary Cognitive Therapy: Theory, Research, and Practice (2006) 
 The Therapeutic Relationship in the Cognitive Behavioral Psychotherapies (2007) 
 Treatment Resistant Anxiety Disorders: Resolving Impasses to Symptom Remission (2009) 
 Emotion Regulation in Psychotherapy: A Practitioner's Guide (2011) 
 Treatment Plans and Interventions for Depression and Anxiety Disorders, 2e (2011) 
 Overcoming Resistance in Cognitive Therapy (2012) 
 Emotional Schema Therapy (2015) 
 Cognitive Therapy Techniques, Second Edition: A Practitioner's Guide (2017) 
 Science and Practice in Cognitive Therapy: Foundations, Mechanisms, and Applications (2018) 
 Emotional Schema Therapy: Distinctive Features (2019) 
 The Jealousy Cure: Learn to Trust, Overcome Possessiveness, and Save Your Relationship (2018) 
 Don't Believe Everything You Feel: A CBT Workbook to Identify Your Emotional Schemas and Find Freedom from Anxiety and Depression (2020) 
 If Only... Finding Freedom from Regret (2022)

References

External links 

 The American Institute for Cognitive Therapy

21st-century American psychologists
1946 births
Living people
Yale University alumni
20th-century American psychologists